Belmont is a Georgian house and gardens in Throwley, near Faversham in east Kent. Built between 1769 and 1793, it has been described as "a marvellous example of Georgian architecture that has remained completely unspoilt". The house is famous for the most extensive private collection of clocks in England. The house, garden and clock collection were all featured in March 2023 in an episode of the BBC TV programme Antiques Roadshow which was filmed in 2022.

History
There was no house or estate on the site until the land was bought in 1769 by Edward Wilks, store-keeper of the Royal Powder Mills at Faversham. It was designed by the architect Samuel Wyatt. The original house still stands as a wing of the present building. The current house was largely created between 1789–1793 by Colonel John Montresor of the Royal Engineers. His career was cut short when he was accused of embezzlement and the house was bought at auction in 1801 by General George Harris, 1st Baron Harris, for £9,000. His descendants continued to live at Belmont, the clock collection being assembled by the 5th Lord Harris, who served as the first President of the Antiquarian Horological Society, for which Jonathan Betts acts as Curatorial Adviser. The house is now held by a trust established by Lord Harris.

Gardens
They cover up to 14 acres. In the grounds are a walled garden, pinetum, Victorian shell grotto and an orangery planted with orange trees, palms and other tropical trees. In 2001, the kitchen garden was restored according to a design by Arabella Lennox-Boyd. The Walnut Walk, passes a line of pets' graves leads to the 'Prospect Tower', it was originally used as a summerhouse, and then later used as a pavilion by George Harris, 4th Baron Harris.

The tower can be rented via the Landmark Trust.

Notes and references

External links
 Belmont House and Gardens web site

Country houses in Kent
Historic house museums in Kent
Gardens in Kent
Horological museums in the United Kingdom